Control Arms Foundation of India is a New Delhi-based gun control organisation co-founded in 2004 by activist Binalakshmi Nepram to curb armed violence caused by the proliferation of small arms and improvised explosive devices.

The organisation was formerly known as India Working Group on Arms Control (IWGAC).

References

External links
 

Organisations based in Delhi
2004 establishments in Delhi
Gun control advocacy groups
Organizations established in 2004